Julia Margaret Duffy (née Hinds; June 27, 1951) is an American actress. She began her career in television, appearing in minor guest roles before being cast in the role of Penny Davis in the series The Doctors from 1973 until 1977. She starred in the acclaimed Broadway revival of Once in a Lifetime in 1978. 

From 1983 to 1990, she played Stephanie Vanderkellen in the hit TV series Newhart. The role garnered her critical acclaim, including seven Primetime Emmy Award nominations, three Viewers for Quality Television awards, and a Golden Globe Award nomination for Best Supporting Actress – Series, Miniseries or Television Film.

Following the conclusion of Newhart, Duffy continued to work in television, playing the original Maggie Campbell on Baby Talk (1991) and Allison Sugarbaker on Designing Women (1991–1992). In the 2000s, Duffy appeared in guest roles on Reba and Drake & Josh, as well as having supporting roles in 2003's comedy films Dumb and Dumberer: When Harry Met Lloyd and Intolerable Cruelty. She had recurring guest roles on the series Shameless (2011–2013) and Looking (2014–2015), and appeared in a supporting role in the drama Camp X-Ray (2014).

Early life, family, and education
Julia Margaret Hinds was born on June 27, 1951, in Minneapolis, Minnesota, the youngest of four daughters of Joseph Hinds and Mary Duffy. When Julia was seven years old, her father died, and her mother later remarried and worked as a real estate agent.

She began acting as an adolescent, appearing in local stage productions at Minneapolis's Old Log Theatre. At age 18, she appeared in a Minneapolis production of The Girl in the Freudian Slip. In 1970, Duffy moved to New York City, and she enrolled at the American Academy of Dramatic Arts, from which she graduated in 1972. While attending, she worked as a waitress and hatcheck girl.

Career

Career beginnings
Her early career included parts in soap operas such as One Life to Live, The Doctors, and Love of Life. In 1978, Duffy starred in the critically acclaimed Broadway revival of Once in a Lifetime.

She appeared in supporting roles in the exploitation horror film Butcher, Baker, Nightmare Maker (1981), also known as Night Warning, as well as Cutter's Way (1981). She appeared in a first season episode of the television sitcom Cheers in 1982. Initially, she had been considered for the role of Diane Chambers, the sitcom's female lead.

In 1983, she played Princess Ariel Baaldorf in the medieval adventure spoof TV series Wizards and Warriors, which lasted one season on the CBS network.

Newhart and critical acclaim
Duffy joined the main cast of the sitcom Newhart during its second season in 1983 as the Stratford Inn's self-infatuated, upper-class maid Stephanie Vanderkellen. She had initially made an appearance in the 14th episode of the first season of the series, playing the part of then-maid Leslie Vanderkellen's cousin. It is perhaps her most popular role and one she played for seven seasons. She earned Emmy Award nominations for Outstanding Supporting Actress in a Comedy Series for the role every year from 1984 through 1990. She also received a Golden Globe nomination and won three Viewers For Quality Television awards and five American Comedy Awards nominations for her work. During several episodes of Newhart, Duffy was pregnant. To hide it, she wore baggy clothes and stood behind furniture. She remains close to Bob Newhart.

After Newhart
After Newhart ended in 1990, Duffy briefly starred in the sitcom Baby Talk alongside George Clooney, but asked to be released after Clooney walked off the troubled set. The new producers accommodated her, allowing her to then join the cast of Designing Women in 1991. Baby Talk was then retooled and Duffy was replaced by Mary Page Keller. On Designing Women, she essentially replaced Delta Burke, the show's breakout star, who was fired after quarrels with producers. Duffy played Allison Sugarbaker, Burke and Dixie Carter's previously unseen cousin on the show. Duffy's tenure on the sitcom's sixth season turned out to be the highest-rated season in the show's history, partly because of the highly publicized cast additions of Duffy and Jan Hooks. However, because of conflicting ideas about her character, she was amicably released from her contract, thus leading her to be replaced by Judith Ivey.

From 1993 to 1995, Duffy played Barb Ballantine on the short-lived comedy series The Mommies. Duffy played Lindsay Mercer, one of the failed buyers of Winfred-Lauder and the ex-wife of Lord Mercer on The Drew Carey Show. She has a recurring role on the Nickelodeon series Drake & Josh as Linda Hayfer, a high-school English teacher who despises Drake. She appeared on The Suite Life of Zack & Cody as the rich mother of Jason, a boy who goes on a date with Maddie Fitzpatrick (Ashley Tisdale). She made a brief appearance in the Nickelodeon sitcom True Jackson, VP as the owner of a stage that LuLu wanted to rent. 

In 2009, Duffy co-starred with Kelly McGillis in a stage production of The Little Foxes at the Pasadena Playhouse. She later appeared again at the Playhouse in 'The Heiress' starring Richard Chamberlain. In the 2010s, Duffy had recurring roles on HBO's Looking and Showtime's Shameless, as well as Scream Queens, Key and Peele, and other guest roles. In 2014, she appeared in a supporting role opposite Kristen Stewart in the drama film Camp X-Ray.

Her theater credits include the Broadway production Once in a Lifetime as well as numerous regional theater credits. Most recently, Duffy appeared in a stage production of Guess Who's Coming to Dinner at the Huntington Theatre in Boston, directed by David Esbjornson, for which she received an IRNE Award nomination for Best Supporting Actress in a Drama, followed by a lead in the play Sex and Education at the Laguna Playhouse in the spring of 2016. In December 2016, Duffy co-starred with Mare Winningham and Mark Blum in an Off-Broadway production of Rancho Viejo directed by Daniel Aukin Playwrights Horizons. Ben Brantley of The New York Times described Duffy's performance as "hilariously withering." She starred in the ensemble comedy The Outsider at Paper Mill Playhouse in New Jersey, along with Broadway veterans Lenny Wolpe, Kelley Curran and Manoel Felciano, directed by David Esbjornson.

Other pursuits
Duffy wrote the book Bad Auditions, published by Smith and Kraus in 2018.

Personal life
Duffy married actor Jerry Lacy, co-star of Dark Shadows and Love of Life, in 1984. In 1986, they had their first child, a daughter, Kerry. In August 1989, Duffy gave birth to their second child, a son, Daniel. Daniel died by suicide in April 2019.

Filmography

Film

Television

Stage credits

Accolades

References

External links

 

1951 births
Living people
Actresses from Minneapolis
20th-century American actresses
21st-century American actresses
American Academy of Dramatic Arts alumni
American film actresses
American stage actresses
American soap opera actresses
American television actresses